Oteha is an Auckland suburb, which is under local governance of Auckland Council. The area is defined by Oteha Valley Road on the north, East Coast Road on the east, Spencer Road on the south, and the Auckland Northern Motorway on the west. Until the very end of the 20th century, the area was rural.

Demographics

Oteha had a population of 5,112 at the 2018 New Zealand census, an increase of 603 people (13.4%) since the 2013 census, and an increase of 2,079 people (68.5%) since the 2006 census. There were 1,665 households, comprising 2,433 males and 2,679 females, giving a sex ratio of 0.91 males per female, with 1,023 people (20.0%) aged under 15 years, 1,155 (22.6%) aged 15 to 29, 2,391 (46.8%) aged 30 to 64, and 546 (10.7%) aged 65 or older.

Ethnicities were 37.0% European/Pākehā, 2.4% Māori, 1.5% Pacific peoples, 58.3% Asian, and 5.0% other ethnicities. People may identify with more than one ethnicity.

The percentage of people born overseas was 67.1, compared with 27.1% nationally.

Although some people chose not to answer the census's question about religious affiliation, 48.6% had no religion, 37.1% were Christian, 0.1% had Māori religious beliefs, 3.0% were Hindu, 2.0% were Muslim, 3.2% were Buddhist and 1.3% had other religions.

Of those at least 15 years old, 1,464 (35.8%) people had a bachelor's or higher degree, and 321 (7.9%) people had no formal qualifications. 654 people (16.0%) earned over $70,000 compared to 17.2% nationally. The employment status of those at least 15 was that 2,076 (50.8%) people were employed full-time, 555 (13.6%) were part-time, and 138 (3.4%) were unemployed.

Education
The school opened in 2004.

It is a private Christian school.

Notes

Suburbs of Auckland
North Shore, New Zealand